Velhavali is a village in Mawal taluka of Pune district in the state of Maharashtra, India.

Administration
The village is administrated by a sarpanch, an elected representative who leads a gram panchayat. At the time of the 2011 Census of India, the gram panchayat governed four villages and was based at Sangise.

Demographics
As of the 2011 census, the village consisted of 30 households. The population of 148 was split between 81 males and 67 females.

See also
List of villages in Mawal taluka

References

Villages in Mawal taluka